Kate M. Fox (born 1955) is an American lawyer and judge, who has served as the chief justice of the Wyoming Supreme Court since 2021.

Fox moved to Wyoming when she was 16, after her family bought a ranch near Dubois. She completed a bachelor's degree at the University of Wyoming in 1976, and a J.D. degree at the University of Wyoming College of Law in 1989. She was editor-in-chief of the Land & Water Law Review. Fox clerked for federal judge Clarence Addison Brimmer Jr., of the United States District Court for the District of Wyoming, in 1989–90.

Fox was in private practice from 1990 to 2013 with the law firm Davis & Cannon in Cheyenne, Wyoming. She specialized in employment law and natural resources law. Fox also served for five years on the Wyoming State Bar Board of Professional Responsibility, and on the Standing Committee on Local Rules for the U.S. District Court for Wyoming.

In August 2013, Wyoming Supreme Court justice Barton R. Voigt announced his retirement. The Wyoming Judicial nominating commission submitted the names of three possible replacements to the Governor of Wyoming, Matt Mead. Fox was one of the candidates, along with attorneys Patrick R. Day and Robert Tiedeken.

Governor Matt Mead announced on November 21, 2013, that he had selected Fox for the vacancy. She is the second woman appointed to the Wyoming Supreme Court, after Marylin S. Kite. Fox began her service on the court in January 2014.

Fox won a retention election in 2016, with 76 per cent of the vote, to complete the remaining two years of Justice Voigt's term. She was re-elected to a new eight-year term in November 2018. On July 1, 2021, Fox became Chief Justice after Michael K. Davis's term as Chief Justice ended. She is the second woman Chief Justice in Wyoming history.

References

|-

1955 births
Living people
20th-century American women lawyers
20th-century American lawyers
21st-century American judges
21st-century American women lawyers
21st-century American lawyers
21st-century American women judges
Chief Justices of the Wyoming Supreme Court
Justices of the Wyoming Supreme Court
People from Dubois, Wyoming
University of Wyoming alumni
Women chief justices of state supreme courts in the United States